Khabez is a rural locality (an aul) and the administrative center of Khabezsky District of the Karachay-Cherkess Republic, Russia. Population:

Demographics
Population: 

In 2002, the ethnic composition of the population was as follows:
Cherkess (93.0%)
Abazins (4.1%)
Russians (1.2%)
all other ethnicities comprising less than 1% of population each.

References

Rural localities in Karachay-Cherkessia